Cirripectes filamentosus, the filamentous blenny, is a species of combtooth blenny found in coral reefs in the western Pacific and Indian oceans.  This species reaches a length of  TL.

References

filamentosus
Fish described in 1877